MAX (also known as myc-associated factor X) is a gene that in humans encodes the MAX transcription factor.

Function 

The protein product of MAX contains the basic helix-loop-helix and leucine zipper motifs. It is therefore included in the bHLHZ family of transcription factors. It is able to form homodimers with other MAX proteins and heterodimers with other transcription factors, including Mad, Mxl1 and Myc. The homodimers and heterodimers compete for a common DNA target site (the E-box) in a gene promoter zone. Rearrangement of dimers (e.g., Mad:Max, Max:Myc) provides a system of transcriptional regulation with greater diversity of gene targets. Max must dimerise in order to be biologically active.

Transcriptionally active hetero- and homodimers involving Max can promote cell proliferation as well as apoptosis.

Interactions 

The protein product of Max has been shown to interact with:
 Myc,
 MNT,
 MSH2,
 MXD1,
 MXI1,
 MYCL1,
 N-Myc, 
 SPAG9, 
 TEAD1, and
 Transformation/transcription domain-associated protein.

Clinical relevance
This gene has been shown mutated in cases of hereditary pheochromocytoma. More recently the Max gene becomes mutated and becomes inactivated in small cell lung cancer (SCLC). This is mutually exclusive with alterations at Myc and BRG1, the latter coding for an ATPase of the SWI/SNF complex. It was demonstrated that the BRG1 product regulates the expression of Max through direct recruitment to the Max promoter region, and that depletion of BRG1 strongly hinders cell growth, specifically in Max-deficient cells, suggesting that the two together cause synthetic lethality. Furthermore, Max required BRG1 to activate neuroendocrine transcriptional programs and to up-regulate Myc targets, such as glycolytic-related genes.

References

Further reading

External links 
 
 

Transcription factors